The Houses of Mississippi River Men Thematic Resource (TR) is a multiple property submission to the National Register of Historic Places which was approved on April 13, 1979.  The structures are all located in the town of  LeClaire in Scott County, Iowa, United States.

Structures 
The submission includes thirteen architecturally and historically significant structures.  The houses included, in order from their NRHP reference number, are:

{| class="wikitable"
!Resource Name 
!Image 
!Address 
!Built 
!City 
!Note
|-
| Dawley House  
| 
| 127 S. 2nd St. 
| 1851 
| LeClaire 
|Italianate style home
|- 
| Horton–Suiter House 
| 
| 102 S. 2nd St. 
| 1860 
| LeClaire 
|Italianate style home
|-
| Kattenbracher House 
| 
| 1125 S. 2nd St.  
| 1860 
| LeClare 
| 
|-
| McCaffrey House 
| 
| 208 N. Cody Rd 
| 1870 
| LeClaire 
|Italianate style home
|-
| Old Mill House 
| 
| 419 N. Cody Rd. 
| 1851 
| LeClaire 
|Greek Revival style home
|-
| Rambo House 
| 
| 430 N. Cody Rd. 
| 1855
| LeClaire 
|Italianate style home
|-
| John Smith House   
| 
| 426 Dodge 
| 1852 
| LeClaire
|
|-
| John H. Suiter House 
| 
| 1220 N. 2nd St. 
| 1855 
| LeClaire 
|
|-
| Jacob Suiter House 
| 
| 2214 S. 2nd St. 
| 1860 
| LeClaire 
|Italianate style home
|-
| William Suiter House 
| 
| 227 Wisconsin 
| 1855 
| LeClaire
|
|-
| George Tromley Sr. House 
| 
| 806 N. Cody Rd. 
| 1850 
| LeClaire 
|
|-
| George Tromley Jr. House 
| 
| 127 Jones St. 
| 1865 
| LeClaire
|
|-
| Samuel Van Sant House  
| 
| 322 N. Cody Rd. 
| 1860 
| LeClaire 
|
|}

References 

National Register of Historic Places Multiple Property Submissions in Iowa
Houses in Le Claire, Iowa
Buildings and structures in Scott County, Iowa